Constance Nonhlanhla Mkhonto is a South African politician and Member of Parliament in the National Assembly for the Economic Freedom Fighters party.

Career
Mkhonto had served as the executive mayor of the Ehlanzeni District Municipality in Mpumalanga and as a manager in Mpumalanga's House of Traditional Leaders. She was also a teacher.

She then became a member of the Economic Freedom Fighters party. In December 2019, Mkhonto was elected to the Central Command Team, its highest decision-making body, as an additional member.

Mkhonto entered the National Assembly on 13 June 2020. During a debate on farm murders in September 2020, she said that it could be a "scam" by right-wingers to deflect law enforcement's attention.

References

External links
Ms Constance Nonhlanhla Mkhonto at Parliament of South Africa

Living people
Year of birth missing (living people)
Economic Freedom Fighters politicians
Women members of the National Assembly of South Africa
Members of the National Assembly of South Africa
21st-century South African politicians
21st-century South African women politicians